The 1981 Women's World Open Squash Championship was the women's edition of the 1981 World Open, which serves as the individual world championship for squash players. The event took place in Toronto in Canada during October 1981. Rhonda Thorne won the World Open title, defeating Vicki Cardwell in the final.

Seeds

Draw and results

First round

Second round to final

See also
World Open
1981 Men's World Open Squash Championship

References

External links
Womens World Open

1981 in squash
World Squash Championships
Squash tournaments in Canada
1981 in Canadian women's sports
1981 in women's squash
International sports competitions hosted by Canada